The European Journal of Medical Research is a peer-reviewed medical journal. Established as a print journal published by Holzapfel Verlag in 1995, it was relaunched in 2012 as an open-access online-only format by BioMed Central.

References

External links 
 

General medical journals
English-language journals
Publications established in 1995
BioMed Central academic journals
Monthly journals
Creative Commons Attribution-licensed journals